Aengwirden is a former municipality in the Dutch province of Friesland. It covered the area around the village of Tjalleberd. It existed until July 1, 1934.

The area of the former municipality is now a part of the municipality of Heerenveen.

Former municipalities of Friesland